This is a list of heads of the West Herzegovina Canton.

Heads of the West Herzegovina Canton (1996–present)

Governors

Prime Ministers

External links
World Statesmen - West Herzegovina Canton

West Herzegovina Canton